Diary of a Wimpy Kid: Rodrick Rules (stylized as Rodrick Rüles) is a 2022 computer-animated comedy film directed by Luke Cormican (in his feature directorial debut) from a screenplay by Jeff Kinney, based on his 2008 book of the same name. It is a sequel to Diary of a Wimpy Kid (2021) and is the second adaptation of Rodrick Rules following the 2011 live-action film, while also being the second fully-animated film in the Diary of a Wimpy Kid film series and the sixth installment overall. Brady Noon, Ethan William Childress, Chris Diamantopoulos, Erica Cerra, and Hunter Dillon reprise their roles as characters from the first film, while Ed Asner posthumously portrays Grandpa Heffley. The film is one of Asner's final voice roles recorded before his death on August 29, 2021 and is dedicated to his memory.

Diary of a Wimpy Kid: Rodrick Rules was produced by Walt Disney Pictures and Bardel Entertainment, with the latter providing animation services, and it was released on Disney+, as a Disney+ original film, on December 2, 2022. Unlike its predecessor It received mixed reviews, criticizing the characters, the plot, and the absence of elements from the original book, but continuing the streak of voice acting praise, while the animation split critics and audiences with many of them deeming it a deep inferior over its predecessor.

Plot
Greg's parents reveal that they are going away for the weekend and taking Manny with them. Rodrick takes advantage of this and informs Greg that they are throwing a party together, reminding him of The Heffley Brothers. Rodrick sends the "party text" on his phone and tells Greg to bring his "friends" over. Greg invites Rowley over to help, but they both end up doing all the work while Rodrick sits and directs. He locks them in the basement after tells them to get an extra table. Greg loosens the doorknob and takes photos of the party as "blackmail". In the morning, they are let out and Rowley runs home while Greg confronts Rodrick over what happened. They suddenly get a call from their mother Susan, who informs them that Manny got sick, and they are coming home right away. Rodrick tells Greg to clean up, but Greg refuses. Rodrick finally gets Greg to change his mind and quickly clean up the house. As they think they are done, the bathroom door slides, revealing 'Rodrick Rules' on the bathroom door just as Susan, Frank, and Manny arrive. The brothers quickly remove the bathroom door to Rodrick's room, and switch Rodrick's door with the replacement to the bathroom door after panicking.

Following the incident, Frank makes the two boys rake the leaves. Greg demands Rodrick give him advice in return for helping clean up the party. Rodrick gives in and tells him about his 'Rodrick Rules' which deal with getting things done without making an effort. Greg corrects that 'Rodrick Rules' should be 'Rodrick's Rules', but Rodrick's first rule was "no apostrophes". After raking leaves, Greg quickly becomes impatient but is calmed down when Rodrick teaches him how to play the drums. Greg meets his fellow bandmates of Löded Diper, one of whom is actually a 30-something year old man, Bill, who are going to enter a talent show. Greg is also in it, but is assisting Rowley with his magic act, something which he does not think will be a hit. Frank suspects that the boys are hiding something, but Susan is happy to see them getting along. When Frank asks about Rodrick's "bathroom door" not being locked, Greg covers and claims that he accidentally slammed it too hard, explaining why it does not lock properly. Frank and Susan are going away for the weekend again, but this time, they will leave the boys with Grandpa at the nursing home, which Rodrick seems overly eager about.

At the nursing home, Rodrick reveals that the board games contain plenty of Mom Bucks they can use back at home. He gives some to Greg, but his pants get wet during a game, and he is forced to change in the lobby bathroom. Greg accidentally ends up in the women's room where he gets accused of being a peeping tom. A chase through the old folks home ensues, but he manages to get back to the room. Later, Grandpa tells Greg that he knows that he and Rodrick did not want to come, but he admires that they hang out, something that Frank fails to do with his siblings. The next school day, Rowley reminds Greg that he needed to do his life science project and he rushes to Rodrick for help. He gives him his old life science project on the condition that he hand over some Mom Bucks. Greg does so, but upon arriving at school realizes that it is a failed project about plants sneezing.

Greg angrily reveals his blackmail to Rodrick and demands he pay up in Mom Bucks. Rodrick gives $200 but, he accidentally bumps into Susan, who sees the photos, and she and Frank punish both the boys. One of Rodrick's punishments in particular is that he is not allowed to perform in the talent show, though Greg is still forced to perform with Rowley. When Greg tells Rodrick he didn't expect this, Rodrick angrily tells that never would have happened if he hadn't "snitched". As payback, Rodrick reveals that he took photos of the pictures in Greg's diary about the restroom incident and threatens to send them to his friends who will send them to their siblings. They get the phone away from Rodrick, but Rowley accidentally sends the photos. To Greg's surprise, the story at school got twisted to being about Greg winning the top prize at a bingo competition and making a big getaway, making him popular. Greg is still annoyed however as he has to do the talent show with Rowley, but just before entering, Löded Diper approaches Greg about being their new drummer, as their replacement drummer Larry loves magic and would not mind switching places with him.

Greg starts to question whether he should drum or not, but after Rodrick makes a scathing remark to him, he agrees. Upon seeing Rodrick leaving the show upset, Greg goes out to talk to him and explains that he simply wanted him to be proud of him and was worried they will grow apart. Rodrick tells Greg that he does care about him and that they will continue to hang out together. Greg gives Rodrick his position as drummer back, despite his parents' wishes and returns to Löded Diper. Frank and Susan extend Greg's punishment, but Greg says it's worth it and Grandpa then commends Frank for raising two good brothers while Susan excitedly dances to the band's song. Rowley's magic show ends up winning the competition while Löded Diper gains a wider audience thanks to Susan. Despite their differences, Greg and Rodrick's relationship improves.

Cast

Hunter Dillon as Rodrick Heffley, Greg's aggressive older brother.
Brady Noon as Greg Heffley, a seventh grader who yearns to be popular.
Ethan William Childress as Rowley Jefferson, Greg's childish best friend.
Chris Diamantopoulos as Frank Heffley, Greg's father.
Erica Cerra as Susan Heffley, Greg's mother.
Gracen Newton as Manny Heffley, Greg's younger brother
Veena Sood as the lady in the elevator
Ed Asner as Grandpa Heffley, Greg's grandfather.
Kimberly Brooks as a news anchor
Nathan Arenas as Mackie, a member of Rodrick's band
Jimmy Tatro as Bill Walter, a member of Rodrick’s band
Vincent Tong as Leland, Rowley's neighbor and babysitter
Albert Tsai as Drew, a bass guitarist in Rodrick's band
Hudson Yang as Larry, a replacement drummer for Rodrick's band
Lex Lang as the talent show announcer

Production
On October 23, 2021, Jeff Kinney revealed that sequels to Diary of a Wimpy Kid were already in development. On Disney+ Day 2021, Kinney revealed the first sequel, which is based on Rodrick Rules. By October 2022, Luke Cormican was announced as the film's director.

Music
In March 2022, composer John Paesano confirmed that he would return to score the film's music. By October, Paesano was confirmed as composer.

The song from the movie, “Can You Smell Us Now?” is also used in the 17th book in the main series, Diary of a Wimpy Kid: Diper Överlöde.

Release
On Disney+ Day 2021, Kinney revealed that Rodrick Rules was set to be released in 2022. On September 12, 2022, it was announced for a release date of December 2, 2022.

Marketing
A teaser poster for the film was released alongside the announcement of the release date. A trailer for the film was released on October 18, 2022.

Reception
On the review aggregator site Rotten Tomatoes, the film holds a 50% based on reviews from 10 critics.

Calum Marsh of The New York Times says on Rotten Tomatoes, “It’s the sort of bland, innocuous trifle that will swiftly recede into the oblivion of a streaming service menu — a comedy without laughs and a family movie without heart, lacking any of the wit or charm of Kinney’s original stories.”

Future
On December 3, 2021, Kinney stated that he intends to adapt all his books into animated features for Disney+.

Notes

References

External links
 

2020s American animated films
2020s Canadian films
2020s children's comedy films
2020s children's animated films
2022 computer-animated films
2022 films
American sequel films
American children's animated comedy films
Canadian sequel films
Canadian animated comedy films
Canadian animated feature films
2020s English-language films
Films scored by John Paesano
Disney+ original films
Diary of a Wimpy Kid (film series)
Walt Disney Pictures animated films